The 2008 FIRS Intercontinental Cup was the eleventh edition of the roller hockey tournament known as the Intercontinental Cup, played on September 29, 2008 at Molins de Rei, Spain. FC Barcelona won the cup, defeating Concepción PC.

Match

See also
FIRS Intercontinental Cup

References

International roller hockey competitions hosted by Spain
FIRS Intercontinental Cup
2008 in roller hockey
2008 in Spanish sport